A polesaw (also pole saw or giraffe saw) is a saw attached to a pole or long handle that is used for cutting tree branches that are beyond arm's reach. A polesaw allows its user to cut high branches without the use of a ladder. Polesaws can be manual or motorized. 

A polesaw is common equipment for phone- and powerline workers to prune tree limbs entangled with overhead cables, but the physical nature of the work can be a source of musculoskeletal injuries.

References

Saws